Stephen Rudder (7 September 1872 – June 1954) was a Barbadian cricketer. He played in nine first-class matches for Barbados and Trinidad and Tobago from 1895 to 1902.

References

External links
 

1872 births
1954 deaths
Barbadian cricketers
Barbados cricketers
Trinidad and Tobago cricketers
People from Saint Michael, Barbados